Ahn Bong-soon (Korean:안봉순, ; 安奉舜, March 1, 1894 – February 25, 1967) was an independence activist who worked in Provisional Government of the Republic of Korea during the Japanese Empire and Korean Liberation Army.

Life

Note

References 

 Kim Joo Hyun, <The Independence Hall of Korea> (Shin Saeng Printing Association, 2010)
 "안봉순," p. 388, p. 618 한국독립운동사, 자료 I 의정편 I, 국사편찬위원회, 1970
 안봉순 네이버 백과사전
 "안봉순," 두산백과사전
 "안봉순," 한국민족문화대백과사전
 독립운동사 6(독립운동사편찬위원회, 1975)
 大韓民國獨立有功人物錄(國家報勳處, 1997)
 안봉순, 국가보훈처
 『대한민국독립유공인물록』(국가보훈처, 1997)
 『독립운동사』6(독립운동사편찬위원회, 1975)

South Korean expatriates in Taiwan
South Korean expatriates in China
1967 deaths
1894 births
Korean independence activists